The Evangelical Lutheran Church of Cameroon (EELC) is a Lutheran denomination in Cameroon. The EELC was registered as a religious body in Cameroon in 1965 and currently has approximately 253,000 members in 1,300 congregations nationwide.

The current bishop of the EELC is the Rev Dr Ruben Ngozo.

History

The EELC traces its beginnings from the work of independent American mission known as the Sudan Mission led by Adolphus Gunderson and the Norwegian Missionary Society (NMS) led by Jens Nikolaisen in the 1920s. The Sudan Mission established itself among the Gbaya people while the NMS worked among the Mbum people in the Adamawa Region in 1923 and 1925 respectively.

In 1925, both the Sudan Mission and the NMS cooperated in their mission and a hospital was established in Ngaoundéré while a seminary was established in Meiganga.

With a framework of collaboration firmly established, discussions were initiated in 1950 for the establishment of a national church in Cameroon. In 1960, an agreement was reached and the Evangelical Lutheran Church of Cameroon and the Central African Republic ) was established. In 1965, the Church was registered as the Evangelical Lutheran Church of Cameroon and in 1973, the Evangelical Lutheran Church of the Central African Republic formally separated as an independent national church.

Structure

The EELC comprises congregations, districts, parishes and 10 episcopal regions. The overall coordination of the EELC is conducted by the Executive Board convened by the Bishop. The Executive Board comprises the Bishop, the Assistant Bishop, the Secretary General, the Financial Controller, and the Coordinators of the three National Departments; Evangelisation and Mission, Christian Education, Communications, and Diaconal Services.

The highest decision making body is the General Synod of the EELC, composed of delegates from the various congregations. The General Synod elects a Synodal Council which is led by a lay President.

Presidents of the EELC

 1960-1963
 Rev Andersen

 1963-1977
 Rev Paul Darman

 1967-1977
 Rev Joseph Medoukan

 1977-1985
 Rev Paul Darman

 1985-1997
 Rev Songsare Amtse Pierre

 1997-2000 
 Rev Philemon Barya

 2000–September 2009
 Rev Dr Thomas Nyiwe

Bishops of the EELC

 2009 - 2013
 Rev Dr Thomas Nyiwe

 2013 -
Rev Dr Ruben Ngozo

Medical work

The Evangelical Lutheran Church of Cameroon has been active through much of the twentieth century and has been responsible for collaborating with other institutions to pursue development in Cameroon. One such program in which the church is involved is the Protestant Hospital of Ngaoundéré that was set up in the 1950s. The Health Department of the EELC, or OSEELC, is a large and vibrant ministry operating three large hospitals and fifteen health centres.

The three hospitals operated by the EELC are:

 Protestant Hospital of Ngaoundéré
 Protestant Hospital of Garoua-Boulaï
 Protestant Hospital of Ngaoubela

Bible school and seminaries

The ELCC trains pastors, catechists and evangelists in Meiganga's Lutheran Theology Institute. Bible school are found in Tchollire, Garoua-Boulaï, Meng and Poli.

Affiliations

The EELC participates actively in ecumenical work through its affiliation with:

 Lutheran World Federation
 Lutheran Communion in Western Africa
 Council of Protestant Churches in Cameroon - CEPCA
 Federation of Evangelical Churches and Missions in Cameroon
 Joint Christian Ministry in West Africa

References

External links
Official site

Churches in Cameroon
Lutheranism in Africa
Lutheran World Federation members